Charles Frith Hodgkinson (1871 – 1948) was an English footballer who played for Burslem Port Vale in the late 1890s.

Career
Hodgkinson probably joined Burslem Port Vale in 1898. His first recorded game was at outside-left in a 3–0 win against Long Eaton Rangers, in a Midland Football League match at the Athletic Ground on 19 February 1898. He scored one goal in two Midland League appearances, before the club was re-elected into the Football League. He played six Second Division games in the 1898–99 season, before leaving the club.

Career statistics
Source:

References

1871 births
1948 deaths
Sportspeople from Burslem
English footballers
Association football wingers
Port Vale F.C. players
Midland Football League players
English Football League players